Mikhail Vladimirovich Sangursky (1894 – 28 July 1938) was a Soviet division commander and Komkor (corps commander). He was born in Moscow. He fought for the Imperial Russian Army in World War I before going over to the Bolsheviks in the subsequent Civil War. He was recipient of the Order of the Red Banner. He was executed during the Great Purge.

References

1894 births
1938 deaths
Sangursky
Russian military personnel of World War I
People of the Russian Civil War
Recipients of the Order of the Red Banner
Great Purge victims from Russia
People executed by the Soviet Union